Last Night From Glasgow (often abbreviated to LNFG) is a not-for-profit independent record label based in Glasgow, Scotland. It was established in 2016 and relies on a crowdfunding business model to operate. The label's name is taken from the line "When I called you last night from Glasgow" in ABBA's Super Trouper.

History 
In January 2016 music fan Ian Smith contacted Murray Easton to discuss setting up a record label that would treat artists more fairly than existing larger labels do. In February of that year Smith and Easton met with friends Andy Hynes, Joe Judge, Stephen Kelly and Ross Mullen to discuss the concept. They agreed to found a record label operated on a patronage model, funded by a £50 donation from 60 of their friends and associates. In return the patrons would receive physical copies of each release and guest list entry to all label events.

The label was founded with the intention of assisting unsigned artists with the physical release and promotion of their music. Artists do not enter into any restrictive contract with the label, retain the intellectual rights to their music and are paid fairly for their work. All profits are reinvested into the objectives of the label; it operates as a not-for-profit private limited company. Operating capital is primarily raised by the sale of annual memberships and in return for their patronage, members receive a 12" vinyl copy of each of that year's releases, digital releases and guest list entry to all album launch events.

The label's inaugural event took place on 2 June 2016 at The Old Hairdresser's venue in Glasgow, with 100 members and a roster of three artists. According to Smith, in the 2017 membership year the label operated with '200 or so' members who received physical copies of five albums (four on vinyl record and one on USB) and one EP as well as digital copies of singles.

In February 2018 it was announced that Last Night from Glasgow had been awarded Creative Scotland funding "...to produce the recording, production, manufacture, distribution and promotion of six vinyl albums and supporting digital releases for six currently unsigned Scottish artists". Further funding was obtained in February 2019 to "record, mix, master, produce, manufacture, promote and distribute seven albums and supporting digital releases.

In March 2020 the label announced they would be releasing 'The Isolation Sessions', an album of LNFG artists covering each other's songs with the proceeds going to venues that had to close due to Covid-19 lockdown laws. As of August 2020 over £3,000  had been donated to events and venues and over £3,500 of stock given to independent record stores.  As part of the project, photographer Brian Sweeney took black and white photographs of LNFG members and artists. The format of the photos was inspired by historical pictures of Glasgow women hanging out of their windows.

In October 2020 LNFG organised a concert in an open-sided gazebo, to meet with local Covid-19 regulations, that The Herald described as 'Scotland's first concert in six months'.

Artists 
The following artists have released music on the Last Night From Glasgow label:

Sub-labels

Komponist 
In July 2019 it was announced that LNFG would be launching a new label 'Komponist', "focussed on the compositional artists as opposed to songwriters. Concentrating on all forms of instrumental music, be it Jazz, NeoClassical, Electronica or Heavy Drone."

Hive 
In 2019 a new label called Hive was announced that would allow artists to use LNFG's promotional services while still self-releasing an album.

Past Night From Glasgow 
In 2020 it was announced that a new label would be set up, called 'Past Night From Glasgow'. The purpose of the label is to re-issue older albums not currently available. The first album announced was Sisters by The Bluebells.

Releases 
Excluding digital-only singles

References

External links 
2018 profile of the label from Creative Scotland

Scottish record labels
Record labels established in 2016
British independent record labels